Lady Anne may refer to:

People
Lady Anne Bacon (née Coke) (c. 1528–1610), English gentlewoman and scholar
Lady Anne Barnard (née Anne Lindsay), also Lady Anne Lindsay (1750–1825), author, artist, and socialite
Lady Anne Berry (née Walpole) (b. 1919), English and New Zealand horticulturist
Lady Anne Blunt (née King-Noel), 15th Baroness Wentworth (1837–1917), co-founder of the Crabbet Arabian Stud 
Lady Anne Brewis (d. 2002), English botanist 
Lady Anne Cavendish-Bentinck (1916–2008), member of the British nobility and wealthy landowner
Lady Anne Churchill (1683–1716), daughter of John Churchill and Sarah Churchill, Duchess of Marlborough, and an ancestor of Sir Winston Churchill
Lady Anne Clifford (1590–1676), the only surviving child of George Clifford, 3rd Earl of Cumberland, by his wife Lady Margaret Russell
Lady Anne Conway, also Lady Anne Finch Conway, also Anne Conway, Viscountess Conway (née Finch) (1631–1679), English philosopher
Lady Anne Cottington, wife of Francis Cottington, 1st Baron Cottington (c. 1579–1652)
Lady Anne Farquharson-MacKintosh, also Lady Anne Mackintosh (1723–1787), Jacobite of the Scottish Clan Farquharson and the wife of Angus, Chief of the Clan MacKintosh
Lady Anne Halkett (née Murray) (1623–1699), religious writer and autobiographer
Lady Anne Horton, also Anne, Duchess of Cumberland and Strathearn (1742–1808), member of the British royal family and the wife of Prince Henry, Duke of Cumberland and Strathearn
Lady Anne Hyde (1638–1671), first wife of James, Duke of York (the future King James II of England and King James VII of Scotland), and the mother of two monarchs, Queen Mary II of England and of Scotland and Queen Anne of Great Britain
Lady Anne Lambton (b. 1954), British actress
Lady Anne Palmer, later Anne Lennard, Countess of Sussex (1661/1662-1721/1722), alias Fitzroy, eldest daughter of Barbara Palmer née Villiers, 1st Duchess of Cleveland
Lady Anne Rhys (née Wellesley) (1910–1998), British aristocrat and socialite
Lady Anne Stanley, Countess of Castlehaven (1580–1647), daughter and heir of Ferdinando Stanley, 5th Earl of Derby
Lady Anne Stanley, Countess of Ancram (c. 1600–1656/1657), daughter of William Stanley, 6th Earl of Derby
Lady Anne Wilson, also Lady Anne Glenny Wilson (1848–1930), Australian poet and novelist

Fictional characters
Anne-Marie, Lady Byrne, a fictional character in the BBC medical drama Holby City

Ships
USS Lady Anne (SP-154), a United States Navy patrol boat in commission from 1917 to 1919
Lady Anne (fireboat), see fireboats of Baltimore